The Young Muslims UK (YMUK) was established in Leeds in 1984 and celebrated its 25th anniversary in 2009. It became the youth wing of the Islamic Society of Britain (ISB) in 1990 with an aim to "provide a vehicle for committed young British Muslims to combine their knowledge, skills and efforts for the benefit of one another and British society as a whole."

The Young Muslims UK is an affiliate body of the Muslim Council of Britain.

In 1995, the organisation participated in the Euro-Islam conference in Stockholm, Sweden, organised on a directive from the Swedish Ministry for Foreign Affairs. The youth section of this conference was dominated by participants with connections to the Muslim Brotherhood and similar forms of ideology, for instance the Jamat-i Islami, according to French islamologist Gilles Kepel. This conference resulted in the founding of the Forum of European Youth and Student Organisations (FEMYSO).

Methods of working

YMUK has been praised for its forward thinking and ability to make Islam relevant to British society: "The establishment of organisations such as Young Muslims UK is a step in the right direction, offering as they do resources for Muslims seeking to make Islam relevant to their own hybrid condition."

YMUK adopt and promote five principles:
 Inviting - "...invites all youth to the message of Islam."
 Teamwork - "...organises all those who respond to its call into a committed, loving and disciplined brotherhood."
 Educating - "...develops the talents, knowledge and understanding of individuals and applies them for the benefit of all."
 Developing - "...promotes personal, spiritual and moral development and building a relationship with God."
 Action - "...initiates various programmes to involve individuals to help society around them."

A key feature that distinguishes YMUK from other Islamic organisations is its lack of discrimination to different Islamic schools of thought: "Some organisations, such as Young Muslims UK, have decided that one's choice of Madh'hab or school of jurisprudence should be a personal choice. Where the organisation needs to take a public position on some issue, however, this is decided by a process of Shura (consultation) in which the views of various madhahhib are considered."

Notable members

These individuals were part of the organisation at some point in its history:

 Ajmal Masroor, television presenter and a candidate for the Liberal Democrats.
 Inayat Bunglawala, Assistant Secretary-General of the Muslim Council of Britain. He Joined the YMUK in 1987.
 Sarah Joseph, editor of emel magazine.

Notable Recent Projects/Events
Heroes 2007 
YM London Treasure Hunt
The Young Muslims Talent Search 
The Muslim Teenager Tour 
YM360

Notes and references

External links
The Young Muslims UK

Islamic organisations based in the United Kingdom
Youth organisations based in the United Kingdom
1984 establishments in the United Kingdom
Islamic organizations established in 1984